The Aeroprakt A-28 Victor is a Ukrainian light aircraft, designed and produced by Aeroprakt of Kyiv. The aircraft is supplied as a complete ready-to-fly-aircraft.

Design and development
The resulting design features a cantilever low-wing, a four-seat enclosed cabin accessed through a hinged windshield, a T-tail, fixed conventional landing gear and twin engines in tractor configuration.

The aircraft has mixed construction, with the forward fuselage made from fibreglass and the tail cone of aluminum sheet. The wings and tail are all-aluminum, while the control surfaces are aluminum frames covered in doped aircraft fabric. The standard engines fitted are two  Rotax 912 or two  Rotax 912S powerplants. The conventional landing gear fits wheel pants and features a steerable tailwheel.

Operational history
One example was registered in 2001 in the United States with the Federal Aviation Administration in the amateur-built category, but on 18 October 2004 it was deregistered and exported to Ukraine.

Specifications (A-28 Victor)

References

External links
 (in Ukrainian)
Official photo gallery (in Ukrainian)

Victor
Low-wing aircraft
2000s Ukrainian civil aircraft
T-tail aircraft
Twin piston-engined tractor aircraft